White liquor is a strongly alkaline solution mainly of sodium hydroxide and sodium sulfide. It is used in the first stage of the Kraft process in which lignin and hemicellulose are separated from cellulose fiber for the production of pulp. The white liquor breaks the bonds between lignin and cellulose. It is called white liquor due to its white opaque colour.

Composition
White liquor consists mainly of sodium hydroxide and sodium sulfide in water and is the active component in Kraft pulping. White liquor also contains minor amounts of sodium carbonate, sodium sulfate, sodium thiosulfate, sodium chloride, calcium carbonate and other accumulated salts and non-process elements. These additional components are considered inert in the Kraft process, except sodium carbonate that contributes to a lesser extent.

The chemical composition and properties of the white liquor are calculated as total alkali, active alkali, effective alkali, sulfidity, causticity and reduction.

Application

The Kraft cooking liquor (white) is used to extract the lignin and break down the cellulose composition of wood chips into usable pulp. The white (cooking) liquor becomes weak black liquor and is sent to the recovery process.

See also
Paper chemicals

References

Papermaking